The Kargat is a river in Novosibirsk Oblast, Russia. It is a right tributary of the Chulym.

Course
A significant part of its waters either evaporates or is infiltrated in the ground, and the average discharge at the village of Nizhny Kargat,  from its mouth, is just . The Kargat has no major tributaries.

In its middle course is the town of Kargat, named after the river. Here the river is crossed by the Trans-Siberian Railway and the M51 highway.

The Kargat is frozen over from November to April or May.

See also
List of rivers of Russia

References

Rivers of Novosibirsk Oblast
Endorheic basins of Asia